The 152nd Punjabis was an infantry regiment of the British Indian Army.  It was formed in Mesopotamia and Palestine in May 1918, saw service in the Sinai and Palestine Campaign in the First World War, and was disbanded in September 1921.

History

Background
Heavy losses suffered by the British Expeditionary Force on the Western Front following the German spring offensive in March 1918 resulted in a major reorganization of the Egyptian Expeditionary Force:
 two divisions52nd (Lowland) and 74th (Yeomanry) were transferred to France in April; they were replaced by the 3rd (Lahore) and 7th (Meerut) Divisions from Mesopotamia;
 nine yeomanry regiments were dismounted, converted to machine gunners and sent to France at the end of the same month; the 4th and 5th Cavalry Divisions were reformed with Indian cavalry regiments withdrawn from France and the 15th (Imperial Service) Cavalry Brigade already in Egypt;
 the 10th (Irish), 53rd (Welsh), 60th (2/2nd London), and 75th Divisions were reduced to a single British battalion per brigade.  They were reformed with nine Indian infantry battalions and an Indian pioneer battalion each.
In fact, the 75th Division already had four Indian battalions assigned, so of the 36 battalions needed to reform the divisions, 22 were improvised by taking whole companies from existing units already on active service in Mesopotamia and Palestine to form the 150th Infantry (3 battalions), 151st Sikh Infantry (3), 152nd Punjabis (3), 153rd Punjabis (3), 154th Infantry (3), 155th Pioneers (2), 156th Infantry (1) and the 11th Gurkha Rifles (4).  The donor units were then brought back up to strength by drafts.  In the event, just 13 of the battalions were assigned to the divisions and the remaining nine were transferred from Mesopotamia to India in June 1918.

Formation
The 152nd Punjabis was formed of three battalions in May 1918.  The first two were formed in Mesopotamia with companies posted from battalions serving in the 14th, 15th, 17th, and 18th Indian Divisions.  They were transferred to Egypt in June 1918.  In contrast, the 3rd Battalion was formed in Palestine with companies posted from battalions already serving in the theatre.  All three battalions were assigned to British divisions and took part in the final Allied offensive of the Sinai and Palestine Campaign (the Battles of Megiddo).

Battalions

1st Battalion
The 1st Battalion was formed at Amara on 24 May 1918 by the transfer of complete companies from:
24th Punjabis
25th Punjabis
26th Punjabis
31st Punjabis

It moved to Basra on 29 May where it embarked on 22 June for Egypt.  It arrived at Suez on 11 July and moved to Qantara.  It entrained on 17 July and arrived at Lydda the next day.  It joined the 234th Brigade, 75th Division at Rantis on 26 July.  It remained with the division for the rest of the Sinai and Palestine Campaign, taking part in the Battle of Sharon (19 September 1918).  The division was then withdrawn into XXI Corps Reserve near Et Tire where it was employed on salvage work and road making.  On 22 October it moved to Haifa where it was when the Armistice of Mudros came into effect and the war ended.

On 13 November, the 75th Division concentrated at Lydda and by 10 December had moved back to Qantara.  On 18 January 1919, instructions were received that the Indian battalions would be returned to India as transport became available.  The battalion was disbanded in 1920.

2nd Battalion
The 2nd Battalion was formed at Hinaidi near Baghdad between 16 and 19 May 1918 by the transfer of complete companies from:
37th Dogras
62nd Punjabis
67th Punjabis
84th Punjabis

It moved to Nahr Umar (near Basra) on 19 May where it embarked on 2 June for Egypt, disembarking at Suez on 23 June.  It joined the 181st Brigade, 60th (2/2nd London) Division beyond Beit Nuba on 30 June.  It remained with the division for the rest of the Sinai and Palestine Campaign, taking part in the Battle of Sharon (19–21 September 1918).

After the Armistice of Mudros, the 60th Division was withdrawn to Alexandria by 26 November 1918 where demobilization gradually took place.  Three Indian battalions returned to India in February 1919 and the last had departed by 31 May 1919.  The battalion was disbanded on 4 September 1921.

3rd Battalion
The 3rd Battalion was formed at Sarafand (now Tzrifin) on 24 May 1918 by the transfer of complete companies from:
20th Duke of Cambridge's Own Infantry (Brownlow's Punjabis)
21st Punjabis
27th Punjabis
28th Punjabis

The battalion joined the 159th Brigade, 53rd (Welsh) Division on 4 June 1918 near Ram Allah.  It remained with the division for the rest of the Sinai and Palestine Campaign, taking part in the Battle of Nablus (18–21 September 1918).  At the end of the battle, the division was employed on salvage work and working on the Nablus road.

On 27 October, the division started moving to Alexandria even before the Armistice of Mudros came into effect on 31 October, thereby ending the war against the Ottoman Empire.  It completed its concentration at Alexandria on 15 November.  The division received demobilization instructions on 20 December 1918.  The Indian infantry battalions returned to India as transports became available and 159th Brigade was reduced to cadre by 7 March 1919.  The battalion was disbanded on 30 April 1921.

See also

 Indian Army during World War I

Notes

References

Bibliography

External links
 
 
 
 

British Indian Army infantry regiments
Military units and formations established in 1918
Military units and formations disestablished in 1921